Tuffé-Val-de-la-Chéronne is a commune in the department of Sarthe, western France. The municipality was established on 1 January 2016 by merger of the former communes of Tuffé and Saint-Hilaire-le-Lierru.

See also 
Communes of the Sarthe department

References 

Communes of Sarthe
Populated places established in 2016
2016 establishments in France